The Good, the Bad & the Live is a vinyl box set by American heavy metal band Metallica. It was released on May 7, 1990, including four singles and two EPs.

Background
"The record company will argue that there are people who are into collecting different versions and shaped discs and shit, so why shouldn't we make it available to people who are interested in getting this stuff? Anyway, the idea of this box set crap came up and, well, we decided to go along with it."

- Lars Ulrich, 1990

Box set items
 "Jump in the Fire"
 "Creeping Death"
 The $5.98 E.P. - Garage Days Re-Revisited
 "Harvester of Sorrow"
 "One"
 The Six and a Half Year Anniversary E.P.

The Six and a Half Year Anniversary E.P. track listing
All tracks recorded live in Seattle, Washington.
 "Harvester of Sorrow"
 "One"
 "Breadfan" (Budgie cover)
 "Last Caress" (Misfits cover; hidden track)

References

External links
 Official Metallica website

Metallica compilation albums
1990 compilation albums
1990 live albums
Metallica live albums